Parornix inusitatumella is a moth of the family Gracillariidae. It is known from Québec, Canada, and Kentucky, Ohio, Maine and Michigan in the United States.

The larvae feed on Crataegus species (including Crataegus calpodendron, Crataegus mollis, Crataegus parvifolia and Crataegus tomentosa). They mine the leaves of their host plant. The mine has the form of a large, white, tentiform mine on the leaf upperside. It is almost circular and specked with frass. When completed the leaf is rolled upwards.

References

Parornix
Moths of North America
Moths described in 1873